Harmantepe can refer to:

 Harmantepe, Adilcevaz
 Harmantepe, Çayırlı
 Harmantepe, Elâzığ